Nassoumbou is a department or commune of Soum Province in north-western Burkina Faso. Its capital lies at the town of Nassoumbou.

Towns and villages

See also
2016 Nassoumbou attack

References

Departments of Burkina Faso
Soum Province